The Telcișor is a left tributary of the Sălăuța in Romania. It flows into the Sălăuța in Telciu.

References

Rivers of Romania
Rivers of Bistrița-Năsăud County